Urbonavičius is the masculine form of a Lithuanian family name. Its feminine forms  are: Urbonavičienė (married woman or widow) and Urbonavičiūtė (unmarried woman). The Polish version of the name is Urbanowicz, Russian: Urbanovich.

The surname may refer to:

Saulius Urbonavičius, Lithuanian rock musician from group LT United

Lithuanian-language surnames